We Don't Live Here Anymore is a 2018 Nigerian film directed by Tope Oshin and produced by Olumide Makanjuola, Bose Oshin and Tope Oshin. The drama is based on the story of two LGBT high school students Chidi Egwuonwu (Temidayo Akinboro) and Tolu Bajulaye (Francis Sule). The boys are in love with each other and have to deal with discrimination regarding their relationship.

In 2018, We Don't Live Here Anymore won two awards (Movie of the Year and Tope Oshin for Director of the Year) during the 10th edition of the 2018 Best of Nollywood Awards (BON).

The film stars Osas Ighodaro as Leslie, Omotunde Adebowale David as Ms. Wilson Francis Sule, Temidayo Akinboro, Funlola Aofiyebi, and Katherine Obiang. The movie premiered in Lagos at IMAX Cinemas, Lekki on October 14, 2018.

The film was sponsored by The Initiative for Equal Rights (TIERS).

Plot 

Two students who are in love with each other are caught in a sexual relationship on the premises of Prominence High School. Nike Bajulaye and Nkem Egwuonwu, their mothers, are contacted by the school authorities. They are informed that their children migmayht be expelled from school. They reacted differently to learning the sexual status of their children: Nike Bajulaye tries to wipe out the shame brought to her family by her son, and Nkem Egwuonwu supports her son and accepts him the way he is.

Cast

Francis Sule as Tolu Bajulaye
Temidayo Akinboro as Chidi Egwuonwu
Funlola Aofiyebi as Nike Bajulaye
Katherine Obiang as Nkem Egwuonwuo
Osas Ighodaro as Leslie
Chris Iheuwa as Femi Bajulaye
Abiodun Aleja as Principal
Omotunde Adebowale David as Ms. Wilson
Kunle Dada as Psychatiarist
Funmi Eko as Isioma

Accolades 
In 2018, We Don't Live Here Anymore had several nominations and awards at the 10th edition of the Best of Nollywood awards (BON) held in Kakanfo Conference Centre, Ibadan, Oyo State.

Awards and nominations

References

External links

Nigerian LGBT-related films
2018 LGBT-related films
2010s English-language films
English-language Nigerian films